Romany Wood is a 40 - minute musical work for children's voices, narrator and orchestra. It is a unique work that was written to connect children with classical music and to raise money for charity. There have been over a hundred performances, including two Royal Charity Gala concerts: for Prince Edward to open the new Theatre Severn in Shrewsbury and for the Duchess of Cornwall to raise money for the National Osteoporosis Society at a performance at the Birmingham Royal Ballet School. There has also been a Classic FM broadcast, excerpts of which have been performed on BBC Songs of Praise. Other notable performances include Four in Birmingham Symphony Hall and seven in English Cathedrals - one of which, in York Minster - prompted The Archbishop of York to become Patron of the Romany Wood Charity. Personalities involved in compering or narrating in performances include Michael Maloney, Jasper Carrott, Adrian Chiles, Alan Titchmarsh, Timothy West, Ian MacMillan, Richard Stilgoe, and Nick Owen.

The music was composed by David Gaukroger in 2002. The libretto is by David Carr.

References

External links 
 Official website

Compositions for symphony orchestra
Choral compositions